The 1997 New Hampshire Wildcats football team was an American football team that represented the University of New Hampshire as a member of New England Division of the Atlantic 10 Conference during the 1997 NCAA Division I-AA football season. In its 26th year under head coach Bill Bowes, the team compiled a 5–6 record (5–3 against conference opponents) and finished in first place in the New England Division.

Schedule

References

New Hampshire
New Hampshire Wildcats football seasons
New Hampshire Wildcats football